Jiří Trvaj (born 13 April 1974) is a Czech professional ice hockey goaltender who currently plays with HC Olomouc in the Czech Extraliga.

Trvaj previously played for HC Kometa Brno, HC Havířov, HC Vítkovice, HC Slezan Opava, Lada Togliatti and HC Znojemští Orli.

References

External links

1974 births
Czech ice hockey goaltenders
HC Kometa Brno players
Living people
People from Havířov
HC Vítkovice players
Orli Znojmo players
Sportspeople from the Moravian-Silesian Region
HC CSKA Moscow players
HC Lada Togliatti players
HC Olomouc players
Czech expatriate ice hockey players in Russia